Beck, Bogert & Appice is the only studio album by the rock band Beck, Bogert & Appice, released on March 26, 1973. The group was a power trio featuring guitarist Jeff Beck (who had already been a member of The Yardbirds), bassist Tim Bogert,  and drummer Carmine Appice (both formerly with Vanilla Fudge and Cactus).

The album contains Beck's version of the song "Superstition" which was written by Stevie Wonder. The song had grown out of a jam session between Beck and Wonder, with Beck introducing Wonder to the song's iconic opening drum part.  In return for Beck's work on Talking Book, Wonder had given the song to Beck to record and release as his own single, however delays in the release of the Beck, Bogert & Appice album meant that Wonder's version was released first. 

Beck, Bogert & Appice was released in both conventional 2-channel stereo and 4-channel quadraphonic versions. This was the band's only studio album, as Beck's departure forced a sudden dissolution in 1974.

Track listing

Personnel 
 Jeff Beck – guitars, lead vocals on "Black Cat Moan"
 Tim Bogert – bass guitar, lead vocals (on "Superstition", "Why Should I Care", "Lose Myself with You"), vocals
 Carmine Appice – drums, lead vocals (on "Lady", "Oh to Love You", "Sweet Sweet Surender", "Livin' Alone", "I'm So Proud"), vocals

with: 
 Jimmy Greenspoon – piano on "Sweet Sweet Surrender"
 Duane Hitchings – piano and Mellotron on "Oh to Love You"
 Danny Hutton – background vocals on "Sweet Sweet Surrender"

References

External links 
 Beck, Bogert & Appice – Beck, Bogert & Appice (1973) album review by Stephen Thomas Erlewine, credits & releases at AllMusic
 Beck, Bogert & Appice – Beck, Bogert & Appice (1973) album releases & credits at Discogs
 Beck, Bogert & Appice – Beck, Bogert & Appice (1973) album credits & user reviews at ProgArchives.com
 Beck, Bogert & Appice – Beck, Bogert & Appice (1973) album to be listened as stream on Spotify

Beck, Bogert & Appice albums
Hard rock albums
Blues rock albums
1973 debut albums
1973 albums
Epic Records albums